Joseph Said Pullicino was the chief justice of Malta from 1995 to 2002. On 12 December 2005 he was by unanimous resolution of the House of Representatives appointed Parliamentary Commissioner for the Administrative Investigations known as the Ombudsman. On the 11th of March 2011, again by unanimous resolution, he was reconfirmed for his term as Ombudsman.

References 

Living people
Year of birth missing (living people)
Chief justices of Malta